

España Lake is a lake in the Santa Cruz Department, Bolivia. Its surface area is 34 km².

See also

References 

Lakes of Santa Cruz Department (Bolivia)